Ronald Glasfryn Lewis (11 December 1928 – 11 January 1982), was an actor, best known for his appearances in British films of the 1950s and 1960s.

Early life and career
Lewis was born in Port Talbot, Glamorgan, the son of an accountant. He moved with his family to London when he was seven. During the war he was evacuated back to south Wales, where he attended Bridgend Grammar School. There he played Bassanio in the school production of The Merchant of Venice.

He decided to become an actor after seeing George Bernard Shaw's Saint Joan at the Prince of Wales Theatre in Cardiff. He studied at RADA, graduating in 1953.

Early roles
Lewis's first professional role was in Oscar Wilde's An Ideal Husband (1950) in repertory at Worthing. He was in The Square Ring at Hammersmith.

Lewis had an uncredited bit part in Valley of Song, set in Wales. He was credited for the film version of The Square Ring (1953), for Ealing; The Beachcomber (1954), as a native islander; The Face of Love (1954) for the BBC; and Fantastic Summer (1955) for TV. He had a larger part in Helen of Troy (1955) as Aeneas and provided some romantic interest in The Prisoner (1955), with Alec Guinness.

He was also in a play The Bad Samaritan.

Rise to stardom
Lewis achieved attention with his stage performance in Mourning Becomes Electra by Eugene O'Neill, directed by Peter Hall (1955). This led to Alexander Korda signing Lewis to a contract with London Films and giving him a role in  Storm Over the Nile (1956), as one of the main group of friends.

He was third billed in the comedy Sailor Beware (1956), one of the ten most popular films at the British box office in 1956.

Lewis was cast opposite Vivien Leigh on stage in South Sea Bubble (1956) by Noël Coward, replacing Peter Finch at the last minute. Lewis reprised this role on British TV.

He played the important role of Private Wyatt in A Hill in Korea (1956), a Korean War film, alongside George Baker, Harry Andrews, Stanley Baker, Robert Shaw, and, in his first film role, Michael Caine.

Leading man
Rank tried to build Lewis into a star, giving him the lead in a thriller, The Secret Place (1957), alongside Belinda Lee. On British TV he was in Salome (1957), El Bandido and the TV series Hour of Mystery in an adaption of Night Must Fall. He appeared regularly in Armchair Theatre over fifteen years and other British anthology dramas.

He had a starring role as the bad brother in Robbery Under Arms (1957) and was a villain in The Wind Cannot Read (1958). He was in Schiller's Mary Stuart and Ibsen's Ghosts on stage in 1958.

After a TV production of A Tale of Two Cities he supported Hardy Krüger in the Rank comedy Bachelor of Hearts (1958), and a production of Miss Julie (1959) at the Old Vic.  He was Mark Anthony in a production of Julius Caesar at the Old Vic.

In September 1958 Rank announced they would not be picking up its option on Lewis's services. However he was still employed by the studio in Conspiracy of Hearts (1960), playing an Italian officer helping some nuns.

He made The Full Treatment (1960) for Hammer, directed by Val Guest. Guest called Lewis and co-star Diane Cilento "two neglected stars... and I shall go all out to un-neglect them both."  Hammer kept him on for another thriller, Taste of Fear (1961), which was a big hit. So too was Mr. Sardonicus (1961) made for William Castle.

Lewis had a support role in the comedy Twice Round the Daffodils (1962) and was back in the lead for Jigsaw (1962), a thriller directed by Guest.

Lewis had a support role in Billy Budd (1962) and was the romantic lead to star Juliet Mills in the comedy Nurse on Wheels (1963), made by the Carry On team. He had the star role in two costume pictures, Siege of the Saxons (1963) and Hammer's The Brigand of Kandahar (1965).

On stage he was in Poor Bitos (1963).

Decline
His image suffered in 1965 when, while he was appearing in Peter Pan on stage (as Hook), his wife alleged he had assaulted her. Lewis failed to turn up at court and a warrant was issued for his arrest. Press reports of the court case at the time described the incident as "2 'Shiners' For A Film Actor" after Lewis received two black eyes, both in retaliation to his aggression: one from a man who had taken his car keys as Lewis was evidently unfit to drive; and another, at his home in Grays, from the arresting police officer whose presence was prompted by Mrs Lewis' visit to a police station in a "distressed" state. At the trial Lewis admitted driving while unfit through drink, assaulting a police officer, and being drunk and disorderly. He was fined £65 and banned from driving for a year, he was not charged with assaulting his wife.

He focused on stage work in productions such as Raymond and Agnes (1965).

Final years
Lewis was a regular in the TV series His and Hers (1970–72). Apart from a role in Friends (1971) and its sequel Paul and Michelle (1974), his final credits were in TV: Tales of Unease (1970), Hine (1971), The Rivals of Sherlock Holmes (1973), Harriet's Back in Town (1973), Nightingale's Boys (1975), Public Eye (1975), and Crown Court ('Do Your Worst' episode, 1974), Big Boy Now! (1976), Warship (1977), The XYY Man (1977), Z Cars (1978), and The John Sullivan Story (1979).

He was meant to be First Voice in a production of Under Milk Wood at Theatre Gwynedd in 1975. He stopped drinking to prepare himself for the role, but wound up having a heart attack on opening night.

Personal life
Lewis was married twice, both times to actresses: Norah Gorsen (m 1960) and Elizabeth Marlow (m 1967). He had two daughters with Marlow. Once the marriage broke up, he began drinking heavily. In 1979, he collapsed in his dressing room.

In 1981, at the age of 52, he was declared bankrupt with debts of £21,188.

Death
When Lewis committed suicide by taking a barbiturate overdose at a boarding house in Pimlico, Kenneth Williams recorded in his diary entry for 12 January 1982: "The paper says Ronald Lewis has taken an overdose! He was declared bankrupt last year! Obviously nobody offered him work & he was driven to despair. I remember Ronnie... and that drinking session at the White Horse all those years ago... he was a kind boy & people used him. He was 53."

Partial filmography 

 Valley of Song (1953) – Morgan – Miner (uncredited)
 The Square Ring (1953) – Eddie Lloyd
 The Beachcomber (1954) – Headman's Son
 The Prisoner (1955) – The Guard
 Storm Over the Nile (1955) – Peter Burroughs
 Helen of Troy (1956) – Aeneas
 Sailor Beware! (1956) – Albert Tufnell
 A Hill in Korea (1956) – The National Servicemen: Pte. Wyatt / Pte Wyatt
 The Secret Place (1957) – Gerry Carter
 Robbery Under Arms (1957) – Dick Marston
 The Wind Cannot Read (1958) – Squadron Leader Fenwick
 Bachelor of Hearts (1958) – Hugo Foster
 Conspiracy of Hearts (1960) – Major Spoletti
 The Full Treatment (1960) – Alan Colby
 Taste of Fear (1961) – Robert
 Mr. Sardonicus (1961) – Sir Robert Cargrave
 Twice Round the Daffodils (1962) – Bob White
 Jigsaw (1962) – Det. Sgt. Jim Wilks
 Billy Budd (1962) – Enoch Jenkins – Maintopman
 Nurse on Wheels (1963) – Henry Edwards
 Siege of the Saxons (1963) – Robert
 The Brigand of Kandahar (1965) – Case
 Friends (1971) – Mr. Harrison
 The Rivals of Sherlock Holmes (1973, TV Series) – Dagobert Trostler
 Paul and Michelle (1974) – Sir Robert
 Crown Court (1974–1975, TV series) – Dr. Swale / Laurence King / Alexander Gruda
 Big Boy Now! (1976, TV series) – Roy Marchant
 The XYY Man (1977, TV series) – Peter Thresher

References

External links 
 
 

1928 births
1982 deaths
People from Port Talbot
Welsh male stage actors
Welsh male film actors
Welsh male television actors
Drug-related suicides in England
Barbiturates-related deaths
20th-century Welsh male actors
1982 suicides